London Recruits: The Secret War Against Apartheid is a 2012 book edited and compiled by Ken Keable, with an introduction by Ronnie Kasrils and a foreword by Pallo Jordan. It inspired a documentary film, London Recruits, directed by Gordon Main.

Synopsis
The book details the secret activities of foreign volunteers, especially from the United Kingdom and the rest of Western Europe, who worked covertly to assist the African National Congress during apartheid. Ronnie Kasrils a South African young communist, met with George Bridges, London Secretary of the Young Communist League in 1967 and began the process of reviving the ANC presence in South Africa through propaganda. These volunteers were mostly young communists, socialists and Trotskyists. The book reveals work done by volunteers, such as the transport of anti-apartheid leaflets and cassettes from London to counter the South African government's own overseas propaganda machine. A number of the activists were students at the London School of Economics and Political Science, including Ronnie Kasrils. Ronnie Kasrils subsequently became a leader of the armed struggle and a minister in Mandela's cabinet.

Reception
In the Buffalo News the book was described as a series of "revealing, firsthand accounts" and was reviewed in the International Review of Social History from Cambridge University.
The first film made about the Recruits was made by Disobedient Films' Leah Borromeo and Katharine Round for an exhibition called Disobedient Objects at the V&A Museum in London while a talk on the book was held at the Bishopsgate Institute. A film of the book is being produced by Barefoot Rascals and should be released in 2023.

References

External links
 
 The London Recruits film official website

2012 non-fiction books
Politics of London
Books about politics of the United Kingdom
Books about apartheid
Books about activism
Books about propaganda
Non-fiction books about espionage
International opposition to apartheid in South Africa
Books about the African National Congress